Paul Hamilton (born March 23, 1988) is a Canadian soccer player who currently plays for Edmonton Scottish. Previously having played professionally for the Vancouver Whitecaps, FC Edmonton and the Carolina Railhawks.

Career

Youth and College
Hamilton played club soccer for the Calgary Foothills Irish, which he led to a U-18 Alberta Provincial Championship and a silver medal at the National Championships. He began his college soccer career at the University of Cape Breton in 2006, where he was named an AUS second team all-star and AUS Rookie of the Year. He transferred to Trinity Western University in 2007, where he played three years.  He was named first team Canada West all-star in each of the 2007, 2008, and 2009 seasons, and second team all-Canadian in 2007 and 2008. In 2009, he was named first team all-Canadian, Canada West Player of the Year and CIS Player of the Year. He played more than 4,500 minutes for the Spartans in his college career, scoring 2 goals while adding 6 assists over that time. Hamilton was inducted into the Canada West Hall of Fame on September 10, 2019.

During his college years, Hamilton also played with the Vancouver Whitecaps Residency team in the USL Premier Development League, and trained with the senior Whitecaps side.

FC Edmonton
Hamilton signed for FC Edmonton of the new North American Soccer League in 2011, and made his professional debut in the team's first competitive game on April 9, 2011, a 2-1 victory over the Fort Lauderdale Strikers. The club re-signed Hamilton for the 2012 season on October 12, 2011 but he was subsequently released.

Carolina RailHawks
On April 5, 2013 Hamilton signed with Carolina RailHawks and played 24 games for them during the 2013 season.

Edmonton Scottish
Hamilton currently serves as captain of the Edmonton Scottish in the Alberta Major Soccer League since 2015. Hamilton won the AMSL League MVP award in the 2016 and 2018 seasons. In 2016 Edmonton Scottish won the 2016 Challenge Trophy with Hamilton being named the tournament MVP.

References

External links
 

1988 births
Living people
Association football defenders
Canadian soccer players
Soccer players from Calgary
Canadian expatriate soccer players
Expatriate soccer players in the United States
Canadian expatriate sportspeople in the United States
Cape Breton Capers soccer players
Trinity Western Spartans soccer players
Vancouver Whitecaps Residency players
FC Edmonton players
North Carolina FC players
USL League Two players
North American Soccer League players
Calgary Foothills FC players